"So Fine" is a song written by Johnny Otis and performed by The Fiestas.  It reached #3 on the U.S. R&B chart and #11 on the U.S. pop chart in 1959.

Jim Gribble is credited as the writer of the song, however, Johnny Otis filed a lawsuit claiming the copyright of the song, which had been recorded in 1955 by The Sheiks, a group that included Jesse Belvin. Otis' side won the case.

The song was ranked #69 on Billboard's Year-End Hot 100 singles of 1959.

Other charting versions
Ike & Tina Turner and the Ikettes released a version of the song from the album So Fine. It reached #50 on the U.S. R&B chart and #117 on the U.S. pop chart in 1968.
Johnny Rivers released a version of the song as a medley with "Searchin'" which reached #113 on the U.S. pop chart in 1973.
The Oak Ridge Boys released a version of the song which reached #22 on the U.S. country chart and #76 on the U.S. pop chart in 1982.  It was featured on their album Bobbie Sue.

Other versions
The Hollywood Argyles released a version of the song as the B-side to their 1960 single "Hully Gully".
Maurice Williams and the Zodiacs released a version of the song on their 1961 album Stay.
The Ventures released a version of the song on their 1963 album Let's Go!
The Premiers released a version of the song as a single in 1964, but it did not chart.  It was produced by Eddie Davis.
The Believers released a version of the song as a single in 1965, but it did not chart.  It was produced by Joe South.
The Everly Brothers released a version of the song on their 1965 album Rock'n Soul.
Paul Revere and The Raiders released a version of the song as a single in 1966, but it did not chart.
Dale and Grace released a version of the song as the B-side to their 1967 single "It Keeps Right On A-Hurtin'".
The Newbeats released a version of the song as the B-side to their 1967 single "Top Secret".  It was produced by Wesley Rose.
Stone Poneys released a version of the song as a single in 1968, but it did not chart.
Amen Corner released a version of the song as a single in 1969, but it did not chart.
Elvin Bishop Group released a version of the song as a single in 1970, but it did not chart.  It was produced by David Rubinson.
Loggins and Messina released a version of the song on their 1975 album So Fine.

References

1955 songs
1958 singles
1964 singles
1965 singles
1966 singles
1968 singles
1969 singles
1970 singles
1973 singles
1982 singles
Songs written by Johnny Otis
Ike & Tina Turner songs
Johnny Rivers songs
The Oak Ridge Boys songs
Maurice Williams and the Zodiacs songs
The Ventures songs
The Everly Brothers songs
The Newbeats songs
Amen Corner (band) songs
Loggins and Messina songs
United Artists Records singles
MCA Records singles
London Records singles
Warner Records singles
Immediate Records singles
Song recordings produced by Ike Turner

The Ikettes songs